Polymer is a peer-reviewed scientific journal covering all aspects of polymer science. It is published by Elsevier and the editor-in-chief is Benny Freeman (University of Texas at Austin).

According to the Journal Citation Reports, Polymer has a 2020 impact factor of 4.430.

Abstracting and indexing
The journal is abstracted and indexed in:
Chemical Abstracts Service
Current Contents
Inspec
Scopus

References

External links

Chemistry journals
Publications established in 1997
Elsevier academic journals
Biweekly journals
English-language journals